Turn Into is the debut studio album by American indie musician Jay Som, released on July 22, 2016. Jay Som recorded and self-produced the album in her bedroom from March 2014 to October 2015.

Track listing

References

2016 debut albums
Jay Som albums
Polyvinyl Record Co. albums